Tondra may refer to:

 František Tondra (1936-2012) Roman Catholic bishop
 Jacques Tondra, a Congolese songwriter, who wrote the Republic of Congo national anthem La Congolaise
 Tondra Lynford, wife of Jeffrey H. Lynford
 Tondra (character), a fictional character from the 1946 adventure film Queen of the Amazons
 Tondra Reservoir, Philips, Montana, USA; an artificial lake, see List of lakes in Phillips County, Montana
 HD 148427 b (planet), Star Timir, Constellation Ophiuchus; an exoplanet named for the Bengali term for nap (sleep)
 Tondra (album), a 2012 record released by Emma Ejwertz

See also